Ballintaggart Ogham Stones is a collection of ogham stones forming a National Monument located in County Kerry, Ireland.

Location

Ballintaggart Ogham Stones are located inside a round enclosure (diameter 30 m / 100 ft), immediately east of Dingle racecourse and southeast of the town.

History

The stones were carved in the 5th and 6th centuries AD and served as burial markers.

This was anciently the site of a church and old burial ground (An Cheallúnach or An Lisín).

Description

The ogham stones are rounded, made of water-rolled sandstone. Eight of them form a circle, each one lying down pointing outwards. The ninth lies at the centre. Several have been inscribed with crosses.

CIIC 155: AKEVRITTI (presumably a personal name)
CIIC 156: MAQQI-IARI KOỊ MA/QQI MU/CCOI DOVVINIAS (Here is Mac-Iair, son of the Corcu Duibne)
CIIC 157: DOVETI MAQQI/ CATTI/NI (of Duibthe, son of Caitne). The language used here is primitive, lacking vowel affection, placing it around the time of Saint Patrick
CIIC 158: SUVALLOS MAQ/Q̣Ị DU/COVAROS (of Suvallos son of Ducovaros)
CIIC 159: ṂẠQI-DECC[E]DẠ/ ṂẠQ̣Ị/ GLASICONAS (of son of Deichet, son of Glasiconas). The personal name Glasiconas means "grey wolf."
CIIC 160: TRIA MAQA MAILAGNI (of the three sons of Maílagnas) / CURCITTI (of Cuircthe). This stone bears a strange cross: with arms of equal length, two with "E" shapes on the end, one with a "Y" and one with a +
CIIC 161: INISSIO/NAS (a personal name); like CIIC 157 it dates to the 5th century AD
CIIC 162: CUṆẠMAQQ̣I/ AVI CỌRBBI (of Conmac, grandson of Corb)
CIIC 163: N[E]TTA-LAMINACCA KO/I ṂA/QQI MỤCOI DOṾ[I]Ṇ[IA]Ṣ (here is Laminacca's champion, son of the Corcu Duibne)

References

National Monuments in County Kerry
Ogham inscriptions
5th-century inscriptions
6th-century inscriptions